Arun Prabu Purushothaman is an Indian film director and actor who works in Tamil cinema. He is known for directing and writing Aruvi.

Background 
Arun Prabu studied Visual Communication at Loyola College, Chennai.

Career 
Arun Prabu began his film career as a television actor, appearing in the soap opera Annamalai. He has been coached by director Balu Mahendra, and has worked as an assistant director to K. S. Ravikumar in the film Manmadan Ambu. In 2013, Arun Prabu began writing the script for Aruvi, which was subsequently directed by him and released as his first film in 2017. He received critical praise for the film's direction. His second film, Vaazhl has been in production since 2019 and was released on 16 July 2021.

Filmography 

As director and writer

As actor

Awards and nominations

Notes

References

External links 

1989 births
Living people